Four Oaks Halt was a request stop on the former Ledbury and Gloucester Railway. It was located 2 miles north of Newent. The station opened on 16 October 1937 and closed in 1959 when passenger services were withdrawn from the line.

There was a simple wooden platform and shelter, built on the line of the lifted double track when it was singled.

References

Further reading

Disused railway stations in Gloucestershire
Former Great Western Railway stations
Railway stations in Great Britain opened in 1937
Railway stations in Great Britain closed in 1959
1937 establishments in England
1959 disestablishments in England